Thomas Bernard "Windy" O'Neill (September 28, 1923 – February 13, 1973) was a Canadian professional ice hockey player who played 66 games in the National Hockey League with the Toronto Maple Leafs during the 1943–44 and 1944–45 seasons. He won  the Stanley Cup with Toronto in 1945. O'Neil was born in Deseronto, Ontario.

After hockey
After his hockey career ended, O'Neill went to law school, becoming a successful Toronto lawyer. He died of a heart attack on February 13, 1973, while dining at the Dell Restaurant in Toronto with his good friend, author Scott Young. He had married and had five children, Thomas, Gregory, Emmett, Connie and Christopher. He was divorced at the time of his death and had custody of his children.

Career statistics

Regular season and playoffs

References 
 

1923 births
1973 deaths
Canadian ice hockey right wingers
Ice hockey people from Ontario
Lawyers in Ontario
People from Hastings County
Quebec Aces (QSHL) players
St. Michael's Buzzers players
Stanley Cup champions
Toronto Maple Leafs players
Toronto St. Michael's Majors players